Broke* is a feature-length documentary film written and directed by Will Gray.  The film is an autobiographical account of Gray's attempt to break into the music business.  Broke* features appearances by Kelly Clarkson, Seth Godin, John Legend, Buddy Miller, Isaac Slade of The Fray, and Don Was.

Synopsis
Broke* begins two years in the past, at the beginnings of Gray’s independent journey, recording demos in the basement of his friend's home.  The demos come to the attention of producer T Bone Burnett who asks to meet and listen to more of Gray’s music.

Despite these auspicious beginnings, frustrating meetings with a New York record executive fail to produce an acceptable deal, so Gray decides to set out on his own as an independent artist.  The film follows his struggles to establish a fanbase, manage bookings and cancellations, and all of the other exhilarations and frustrations of independent music making.  Broke* features interviews with recording industry insiders about new paradigms for the music business.

Cast 
 Will Gray, himself
Remainder of cast listed in alphabetical order
 Lee Bailey, owner, EURweb
 Bobby Bare Jr. of the record label 30 Tigers
 Lonny Bereal, HitClub Entertainment
 The Candles
 Chopmaster J
 Kelly Clarkson
 Trent Dabbs
 Will Dailey
 Jim “Rocky” Del Balzo, Jim Del Balzo Management
 Bob Donnelly, Attorney
 The Fieros
 Seth Godin
 Mike Grimes, co-owner of The Basement
 Ali Harnell, Sr. Vice President of AEG Live
 Damien Horne
 Hymns, Independent Artist
 Joonie, HitClub Entertainment
 Steven Ivory, music journalist
 Nathan Johnson
 Nathan Lee, independent artist
 John Legend, Columbia Records
 Nicholas “Aqua” McCarrell
 Ian McEvily, Manager, Rebel One Management
 Buddy Miller of New West Records
 Catherine Moore, Director of the Music Business Graduate Program at Steinhardt School of Culture, Education, and Human Development
 Danara (Schurch) Moore, Columbia Records
 Emily Hope Price, Independent Artist
 Ian Quay, A&R and Label Manager, StarTime International
 Justin Roddick, owner, 12th & Porter (a Nashville night club)
 Audrey Ryan of Folkwit Records
 Isaac Slade, Epic Records
 Andy Smith of the band Paper Route
 Beka Tischker, Manager, Advanced Alternative Media
 Don Was

Reception
Newsday called Broke* "a pretty accurate, sometimes wrenching, portrayal of what up-and-coming artists go through to advance their career."  It was selected for presentation at the PhilFM (Philadelphia Film and Music) Festival, and at the Nashville Film Festival, where it was awarded the "Special Jury Prize for Most Original Vision" in the Gibson Music Films/Music City Competition.

References

External links
 

American documentary films
2011 documentary films
2011 films
Documentary films about the music industry
American music industry
Autobiographical documentary films
2010s English-language films
2010s American films